Salacia oblonga, known as oblong leaf salacia in English, ekanayaka in Kannada, ponkorandi in Malayalam, ponkoranti in Tamil, and ekanayake in Tulu, is a climbing shrub that tends to strangle other plants. It is  native to India and Sri Lanka.

Description
Oblong leaf salacia is a climbing shrub with densely warty branchlets. Leaves are oblong, green, veined, and borne on stalks up to 1 cm long. The flowers are green-yellow, appearing in March through May, that yield orange-red berries. It grows primarily in evergreen and semi-evergreen forests.

Traditional medicine
Oblong leaf salacia is described as a treatment for diabetes in the traditional medical systems of India and Sri Lanka.

The closely related species Salacia reticulata and Salacia chinesis are also used for people with diabetes.

References

External links
 Salacia oblonga, Foundation for Revitalisation of Local Health Traditions

oblonga
Flora of Sri Lanka
Plants used in Ayurveda